John Donald Hillaby (24 July 1917 – 19 October 1996) was a British travel writer and explorer.

Early life and education
Hillaby was the eldest of three sons of printer Albert Ewart Hillaby (d. 1967), of Pontefract, West Yorkshire, and Mabel (née Colyer; d. 1977). He was educated at Woodhouse Grove School, Leeds. His younger brother, Joseph Gordon Hillaby (1933-), is a historian and writer, and was chairman of the Council for the Preservation of Rural England and president of the Jewish Historical Society of England from 2006 to 2008.

Career
Hillaby embarked on a career in journalism, interrupted by service in the Second World War.  After the war he worked for the Manchester Guardian, the New York Times and the New Scientist.

In 1949, he published his first book, Within the Streams.  His real impact on the literary scene came in 1964, when he published Journey to the Jade Sea, an account of his 1,000-mile walk with a camel train through northern Kenya to Lake Turkana.  The book set the pattern for his later books, Journey Through Britain (1968), an account of his walk from Land's End to John o' Groats, Journey Through Europe (1972), an account of his walk from Holland to the Italian Alps and back to France, and Journey Through Love (1976).

His earlier journeys were always alone, but after he married Kathleen Burton (also a great walker) in 1981 the two travelled together.  She featured in his later books, Journey Home (1983), John Hillaby's Yorkshire (1986), John Hillaby's London (1987) and Journey to the Gods (1991).

Personal life
In 1940, Hillaby married Eleanor Riley. They had two daughters before divorcing in 1966. His second marriage was in 1966, to Thelma Gordon (d. 1972); he married thirdly Kathleen Burton, in 1981.

References 

John Hillaby website
Obituary, New York Times, 23 October 1996

1917 births
1996 deaths
English travel writers
English explorers
Walkers of the United Kingdom
English male non-fiction writers
20th-century English male writers